Bahçıvanova railway station is a station near Kırcasalih, Turkey. TCDD Taşımacılık operates a daily regional train from Istanbul to Kapıkule, which stops at Bahçıvanova. The station consists of a short side platform servicing one track.

The station was opened in 1971 by the Turkish State Railways.

References

External links
Station timetable
Bahçıvanova station in Google Street View

Railway stations in Edirne Province
Railway stations opened in 1971
1971 establishments in Turkey
Uzunköprü District